The RP-118 class of Harbour tugboats consists of 7 units (the third batch) built for the Marina Militare, named as Rimorchiatore Portuale

Ships

References

External links 
 Ships Marina Militare website

Auxiliary ships of the Italian Navy
Ships built in Italy
Auxiliary tugboat classes